Gymnopilus validipes is a mushroom in the family Hymenogastraceae. It is widely distributed in North America and Europe.

Description
Pileus: 7.5 — 15 cm, convex to broadly convex, margin deeply incurved at first, becoming revolute with age, dry, fibrillose or with small ochraceous brown scales, pale-yellow or ochraceous buff, flesh soft, whitish, yellowish near the gills. 
Gills: Adnate to uncinate, close, thin, yellowish white becoming cinnamon. 
Spore print: Orangish brown.
Stipe: 10 — 13 cm long, 2.5 – 5 cm. thick, equal or swelling in the middle, fleshy-fibrous, solid, elastic, fibrillose, concolorous, white within, the cortina leaves only a faint ring on the stalk. The specific epithet validipes means "having a robust stalk".
Taste: Mild, standing in contrast to closely related bitter-tasting species.
Odor: Pleasant.
Microscopic features: Spores 8 — 10 X 5 — 6 μm, ellipsoid.

Gymnopilus validipes contains the hallucinogens psilocybin and psilocin, the latter at a concentration of around 0.12%.

Habitat and formation
Gymnopilus validipes is found growing gregarious (in groups) to cespitose (in dense clumps) on tree stumps, hardwood logs and debris, widespread in the United States, common from the Great Lakes and eastward.

See also

Psilocybin mushrooms
List of Psilocybin mushrooms
List of Gymnopilus species

References

 Hesler, L. R. (1969). North American species of Gymnopilus. New York: Hafner. 117 pp.

validipes
Entheogens
Psychoactive fungi
Psychedelic tryptamine carriers
Fungi of North America
Fungi of Europe
Taxa named by Charles Horton Peck